Alonso Ferreira de Matos (born 11 August 1980 in Montes Claros), simply known as Alonso is a Brazilian footballer who plays as a left back for Villa Nova Atlético Clube.

He signed with Marítimo for the Portuguese outfit from rivals C.D. Nacional in 2009 and marked his debut with a goal from the penalty-spot in a 1–1 against Benfica.

Alonso previously played for Cruzeiro, Fluminense, Criciúma and Paysandu in the Campeonato Brasileiro. He moved to Portugal in July 2004, where he spent five seasons with C.D. Nacional.

References

External links
 

1980 births
Living people
Brazilian footballers
Brazilian expatriate footballers
Criciúma Esporte Clube players
Cruzeiro Esporte Clube players
Fluminense FC players
Paysandu Sport Club players
Tupi Football Club players
Villa Nova Atlético Clube players
C.D. Nacional players
C.S. Marítimo players
Primeira Liga players
Sportspeople from Minas Gerais
Expatriate footballers in Portugal
Association football defenders